Pedro Portocarrero y Guzmán (1640–1708) was a Roman Catholic prelate who served as Patriarch of West Indies (1691–1708) and Titular Archbishop of Tyrus (1691–1708).

Biography

Pedro Portocarrero y Guzmán was born on February 27, 1640 in Montijo, Spain.
On 27 Aug 1691, he was appointed during the papacy of Pope Innocent XII as Titular Archbishop of Tyrus.
On 4 Nov 1691, he was consecrated bishop by Luis Manuel Fernández de Portocarrero-Bocanegra y Moscoso-Osorio, Archbishop of Toledo, with Fernando Guzmán, Bishop of Segovia, and Luis de Lemos y Usategui, Bishop of Concepción, serving as co-consecrators.
On 12 Nov 1691, he was appointed during the papacy of Pope Innocent XII as  Patriarch of West Indies.
He served as  Patriarch of West Indies until his death in 1708.
In 1706 he left Madrid to settle in Avignon where he died on January 21, 1708.

Episcopal succession

References

External links and additional sources
 (for Chronology of Bishops) 
 (for Chronology of Bishops)  
 (for Chronology of Bishops) 
 (for Chronology of Bishops) 

17th-century Roman Catholic bishops in New Spain
Bishops appointed by Pope Innocent XII
1640 births
1708 deaths